Bancroft This Week is a White Pine Media publication that first appeared in 2000 as Bancroft This Weekend, and was an independent weekly newspaper.

Production 
In its current incarnation, in tabloid-format, it circulates to more than 10,000 homes, as a flyer wrap, in a wide geographic range that spans across much of North Hastings (Hastings County) and its outskirts including Hastings Highlands (Maynooth), Madawaska Valley (Barry's Bay), Bancroft, Wollaston (Coe Hill) and Highlands East (Cardiff & Wilberforce). The publication is delivered every Friday.

The Bancroft Times 
In 2018 Bancroft This Week purchased The Bancroft Times, which has been a family owned independent newspaper since 1894.

See also
List of newspapers in Canada

Postmedia Network publications
Weekly newspapers published in Ontario
Newspapers established in 2000
2000 establishments in Ontario

References

External links 
 Bancroft This Week Official Website